Robert Tinkler is a Canadian voice actor who provides voices for a number of cartoons and anime shows. He voiced Max in The Adventures of Sam & Max: Freelance Police, Delete in the children's animated series Cyberchase, Pelswick Eggert in Pelswick, and Howie in Almost Naked Animals.

In anime, he provides the voice of Crimson Rubeus in the DIC Entertainment dub of Sailor Moon, Gingka Hagane, the main protagonist in Beyblade: Metal Fusion and Brooklyn Masefield in Beyblade G-Revolution. In feature films, he voiced Buddy in The Nut Job.

Early life and career
Tinkler became involved in community theatre, performing in plays and musicals and was subsequently accepted into the Theatre program into Ryerson University, in which he graduated from. At Ryerson, he met future sketch comedy collaborators Mike Beaver, Jason Jones, and Stacey DePass.

He made his first acting career in It's Alive! as an unknown character. Then, he voiced Max in The Adventures of Sam & Max: Freelance Police. Tinkler voiced many characters in many Canadian television shows such as Pelswick as the title character, Medabots as Spike and Seaslug, Cyberchase as Delete, and Jacob Two-Two as Daniel. In The Nut Job, he voiced Buddy, the friend of Surly Squirrel, and Redline. A role he later reprised in The Nut Job 2: Nutty by Nature just as Buddy. In Franny's Feet, he voiced Salsa the Monkey. Starting from 2019, Tinkler is the current voice of Woodstock, a character in the Peanuts comic strips created by Charles M. Schulz.

Earlier before voicing Woodstock, Tinkler also voiced Fish and Thing 1 and 2 in The Cat in the Hat Knows a Lot About That!, including the unnamed Teacher in PJ Masks and The Bobroom as sketch characters with Harry and His Bucket Full of Dinosaurs voicing Steggy, Rover in Lunar Jim, various characters in Inspector Gadget, Howie in Almost Naked Animals, and Beyblade: Metal Fusion as Ginga Hagane.

For his performance as Delete in Cyberchase, Tinkler won an Outstanding New Approaches — Daytime Children's at the 36th Daytime Emmy Awards.

In his late teens, Tinkler became involved in community theatre, performing in plays and musicals, and was subsequently accepted into the Theatre program at Ryerson University (later acquiring his BFA hons). At Ryerson, he met future sketch comedy collaborators Mike Beaver, Jason Jones, and Stacey DePass. His first gig out of school was a series on YTV called "It's Alive". The show was of the sketch comedy variety, and while acting on the series Rob was introduced to and became interested in writing. After the show's cancellation, and growing frustrated with a dwindling influx of acting work at that time, Rob and his then roommates Mike Beaver and Shaun Majumder decided to form the comedy troupe "Beaver, Tinkler, Majumder". This triumvirate soon welcomed Jason Jones, and then Stacey Depass and Jennifer Baxter (who were also on "It's Alive") and the troupe was renamed "The Bobroom". Also during this period, Rob realized an affinity for voice-overs and he booked several animated series including The Adventures of Sam & Max Freelance Police, X-Men and Sailor Moon. After writing, mounting and performing in many live sketch shows with The Bobroom at clubs across Toronto and excursions into Chicago and New York City, the troupe was soon approached by Milan Curry-Sharples about doing the comedy showcase series Comedy Now. Although this show was more of a vehicle for stand-up comedians, this endeavor ultimately led to the development and creation of the sketch comedy series "The Bobroom" for the Comedy Network. Although the series ran only for a limited time, it was a learning ground for Rob as he not only amassed characters but honed skills in writing for the screen. Also around this time, Rob landed several roles on feature film productions, including The Tuxedo and the cult classic Harold And Kumar Go To White Castle. After embarking on a couple of pilot seasons in Los Angeles, Rob received the accreditation to relocate to the US on a full-time basis. There, he has written for several animated series ("Wayside, Pandalian Almost Naked Animals) and did voices on video games (Superman Returns, Marvel: Ultimate Alliance 2), and several pilots and series (Celebrity Deathmatch), including the Fox prime time animated series "American Dad!". He's also performed in countless commercials and had a recurring role as Rachael Harris' whipping boy in ABC's Notes From The Underbelly. Rob plays too many characters to name on PBS's The Cat in the Hat Knows a Lot About That!, as well as voices leading danger dog Howie in Cartoon Network's Almost Naked Animals and Gingka in Beyblade: Metal Fusion. Rob divides his time between LA and Toronto as he continues to develop series and films. In addition to acting, writing, and directing, he is also a Creative Consultant on Almost Naked Animals.

Filmography

Animation
{| class="wikitable sortable plainrowheaders"
|+ List of voice performances in animation
! Year
! Title
! Role
! class="unsortable"| Notes
! class="unsortable"| Source
|-
| –98 || Sailor Moon (DIC Entertainment dub) || Crimson Rubeus || ||
|-
|1996-1998 || Stickin' Around || Additional voices || ||
|-
| –98 || The Adventures of Sam & Max: Freelance Police || Max || || 
|-
|1999-2001 || Angela Anaconda || Bill Anaconda, Mark and Derek Anaconda || ||
|-
| –02 || Pelswick || Pelswick Eggert || || 
|-
| || Undergrads || Mump || ||
|-
| –04 || Medabots || Spike/Seaslug || ||
|-
| –present || Cyberchase || Delete || Nominated – Outstanding New Approaches – Daytime Children's (listed with Cyberchase cast and crew), 36th Daytime Emmy Awards || 
|-
|  || Moville Mysteries || Alonzo Longneck || Episode: "Just My Luck" ||
|-
| –06 || Jacob Two Two || Daniel || || 
|-
| –10 || Franny's Feet ||Salsa the Donkey || ||
|-
|  || Beyblade G-Revolution || Brooklyn Masefield || ||
|-
| -08 || Miss Spider's Sunny Patch Friends || Grub || ||
|-
| rowspan="2" |  || Slam Dunk || Hanamichi Sakuragi || || 
|-
|  || Lunar Jim || Rover || ||
|-
|2008-2009
|Rocket Boy and Toro (Nelvana's Dub)
|Rocket Boy
|
|
|-
|  || Bakugan: New Vestroia || Lync Volan, Helios || ||
|-
| -18 || The Cat in the Hat Knows a Lot About That! || Fish, Thing One, Thing Two || ||
|-
| –11 || Beyblade: Metal Fusion || Gingka Hagane || || 
|-
|  || Sidekick || Nocturna || || 
|-
| –13 || Almost Naked Animals || Howie || || 
|-
|  || Bakugan: Mechtanium Surge || Wiseman, Betadron, Tremblar, Balista || || 
|-
| –12 || Beyblade: Metal Masters || Gingka Hagane || ||
|-
|  || Mudpit || Slime || || 
|-
| –13 || Beyblade: Metal Masters || Gingka Hagane || ||
|- 
| rowspan="2" | –15 || Grojband || G'ORB, Captain Tighty Whitey, Shaven Beard, Barney || || 
|-
| Oh No! It's an Alien Invasion || Shakes || || 
|-
| || Beyblade: Shogun Steel || Gingka Hagane || ||
|-
|2013–2015
|Julius Jr.
|Shaka Brah Yeti
|
|
|-
|  || The Day My Butt Went Psycho! || Deuce || || 
|-
|  || Numb Chucks || Hooves || || 
|-
| -17 || Trucktown || Max || || 
|-
| –present || PJ Masks ||Teacher || || 
|-
|  || Inspector Gadget || Various characters ||  || 
|-
| – || Rusty Rivets || Ray, Botasaur, Bytes, Opera Singing Monkey || || 
|-
| -present || Ranger Rob || Chipper || ||
|-
| –17 || The ZhuZhus || Chunk, Bean || || 
|-
| –18 || Mysticons || Ferrus and Halite Goldenbraid || || 
|-
| 2016 || Trucktown || Max || Nominated – Canadian Screen Award, Best Performance in an Animated Program or Series || 
|-
|2018–present
|Total DramaRama
|Additional voices
|
|
|-
|2018-2023
|Bakugan: Battle Planet
| Tiko, Additional voices
|
|
|-
| 2019–present || Snoopy in Space || Woodstock || || 
|-
| 2019 || Dragamonz || Dax, Master Perros and Azakai || ||
|-
| 2019–present || Alien TV || Ixbee || || 
|-
| 2019–present || Norman Picklestripes || Additional voices || ||
|-
| rowspan="2" | 2020–present || Powerbirds || Nibbles || ||
|-
| Remy & Boo || Boo || ||
|-
| 2021–present || Go, Dog. Go! || Early Ed || ||
|-
| 2021–present || The Snoopy Show || Woodstock, Spike || || 
|-
| 2021 || Snoopy Presents: For Auld Lang Syne || Woodstock, Spike, and Olaf || TV Special ||
|-
| rowspan="3" | 2022 || Snoopy Presents: It's The Small Things, Charlie Brown || Woodstock || TV Special ||
|-
| Snoopy Presents: To Mom (and Dad), With Love || Woodstock / Woodstock‘s Mom || TV Special || 
|-
| My Little Pony: Make Your Mark || Sparky Sparkeroni || ||

|}

Film

Live-action

Awards and nominations
 Nominated – Outstanding New Approaches – Daytime Children's (listed with Cyberchase'' cast and crew), 36th Daytime Emmy Awards
 Nominated – Canadian Screen Award, Best Performance in an Animated Program or Series - Trucktown

References

External links
 
 

20th-century Canadian male actors
21st-century Canadian male actors
Animal impersonators
Canadian male film actors
Canadian male video game actors
Canadian male voice actors
Canadian male television actors
Canadian television writers
Canadian male stage actors
Male actors from Los Angeles
Living people
Toronto Metropolitan University alumni
Canadian male television writers
Canadian sketch comedians
Canadian male comedians
20th-century Canadian comedians
21st-century Canadian comedians
1973 births